The 1904 Cincinnati Reds season was a season in American baseball. The team finished third in the National League with a record of 88–65, 18 games behind the New York Giants.

Regular season 
The Cincinnati Reds had made steady improvements over the past two seasons, and were looking to improve even more in 1904, as they were hoping to contend for the National League pennant.  The Reds won only 52 games in 1901, however, they improved to 70 in 1902, and 74 in 1903.

Joe Kelley returned for his third season as player-manager of the team, as he took over first base on a permanent basis after Jake Beckley joined the St. Louis Cardinals.  Thirty-one-year-old rookie Fred Odwell joined the team after spending the 1903 season with the Louisville Colonels of the American Association, while another rookie Miller Huggins, took over the starting job at second base.

Cy Seymour led Cincinnati with a .313 batting average, while hitting a club high five home runs, and drove in 58 runners.  Tommy Corcoran hit only .230, but he managed to hit two home runs and have a club best 74 RBI.  Rookie Miller Huggins led the Reds with 96 runs, while he hit .296 with two homers and 30 RBI.

On the mound, Jack Harper had a breakout season, as he won a team high 23 games, while posting a 2.30 ERA in 35 starts.  Noodles Hahn had poor run support, as he only had a 16–18 record, however, Hahn had a 2.06 ERA in 35 games, 34 of them starts.  Win Kellum and Tom Walker each won 15 games each, with ERA's of 2.60 and 2.24 respectively.

Season summary 
Cincinnati began the season with a mediocre 8–7 record after fifteen games, however, the Reds won their next eight games to move into second place, just half a game behind the first place New York Giants.  Cincinnati continue to play good baseball, winning seven of their next ten to improve to 23–11, and take a 1.5 game lead over the Giants and Chicago Cubs for first place in the National League.

The Reds, Giants and Cubs continued their battle for first place going into the month of June, but then the Giants got red hot, and Cincinnati, nor Chicago, could keep up with New York.  The Reds had a 13–16 slump to drop their record to 36–27, falling into third place, 11.5 games behind the Giants.  As the season went on, the Cubs, Reds and Pittsburgh Pirates battled for second place, but all three teams were well behind New York. 

On August 7, the Reds, Giants and Pirates were in a three team deal, which included Cincinnati sending Mike Donlin to New York, while the Reds acquired Jimmy Sebring from Pittsburgh.  The team continued playing good baseball for the remainder of the season, finishing with a record of 88–65, good for third place in the National League, 18 games behind the Giants.  The Reds 88 wins was their highest since they won 92 games in the 1898 season.

Season standings

Record vs. opponents

Roster

Player stats

Batting

Starters by position 
Note: Pos = Position; G = Games played; AB = At bats; H = Hits; Avg. = Batting average; HR = Home runs; RBI = Runs batted in

Other batters 
Note: G = Games played; AB = At bats; H = Hits; Avg. = Batting average; HR = Home runs; RBI = Runs batted in

Pitching

Starting pitchers 
Note: G = Games pitched; IP = Innings pitched; W = Wins; L = Losses; ERA = Earned run average; SO = Strikeouts

Other pitchers 
Note: G = Games pitched; IP = Innings pitched; W = Wins; L = Losses; ERA = Earned run average; SO = Strikeouts

References 
1904 Cincinnati Reds season at Baseball Reference

Cincinnati Reds seasons
Cincinnati Reds season
Cincinnati Reds